Who Takes Love Seriously? is a 1931 German romantic comedy film directed by Erich Engel and starring Max Hansen, Jenny Jugo, and Otto Wallburg. It was shot at the Marienfelde Studios of Terra Film in Berlin and on location in the city. The film's sets were designed by the art director Heinrich Richter.

Cast

References

Bibliography

External links 
 

1931 films
1931 romantic comedy films
German romantic comedy films
Films of the Weimar Republic
1930s German-language films
German black-and-white films
Films directed by Erich Engel
Terra Film films
1930s German films
Films shot at Terra Studios